El Guabo may refer to:
El Guabo, Ecuador
El Guabo, Colón, Panama